Chris (July 2010 – 22 October 2019) was a Merino ram who gained international fame in September 2015 after being shorn of a record amount of wool in Canberra, Australia. Chris was named after a sheep character in the sitcom Father Ted (specifically from the episode "Chirpy Burpy Cheap Sheep") by local Bonner resident Sue Dowling, who spotted the sheep wandering in a paddock near the Bonner district in Canberra.

Discovery and shearing  
Chris was found at Mulligan's Flat near the border of New South Wales and the Australian Capital Territory (ACT). His mobility had been impaired as a result of the weight of the fleece he had grown over more than five years. Domestic sheep like Chris raised for their wool have been bred not to lose their coat and need to be shorn regularly, so leaving the sheep unshorn would have put the animal at great risk of infection and/or injury.

Four-time Australian Shearing Championship winner Ian Elkins volunteered to shear the massive ram after being contacted by RSPCA Australia.

Chris's fleece set a world record, beating previous records held by neglected sheep such as Shrek and "Big Ben". It was estimated that Chris's fleece was enough to make 30 jumpers.

Adoption and life at Little Oak Sanctuary 
Chris was put up for adoption by the RSPCA, who reported that the sheep needed to recover from his operation and adjust to a life without a "cumbersome blanket of wool", although his hind legs may have suffered some permanent imbalance from years of bearing the extra weight. Hundreds of people offered to adopt Chris but in September 2015 he was adopted by the Little Oak Sanctuary in New South Wales, where he gradually became more confident with people. The co-founder of the sanctuary reported that he liked having his head scratched.

Death and legacy 
Chris died of natural causes aged 9 on 22 October 2019.

A children's picture book about Chris's life after he was separated from his flock and before he was rescued was written by the RSPCA and illustrated by Kylie Fogarty. Entitled The Misadventures of Chris the Sheep, the story offered young readers a possible explanation for why he grew so big. The book was an effort "to educate children about animal welfare" and proceeds from its sale went to help the RSPCA in the ACT to continue its work protecting, rescuing, caring and advocating for animals in need.

In 2022, an exhausted lost sheep was found on Mount Alexander in Victoria. Named Alex after the mountain on which he was found, the weight of the wool had created critical health problems for him as it had for Chris. Alex was carrying 40 kgs of unshorn wool, only slightly less than Chris. After the emergency shearing that he needed to save his life, he made a full recovery and joined a local animal shelter.

See also 
 Agriculture in Australia

References 

Individual sheep
Australian culture
Australian sheep industry
Individual animals in Australia
2010 animal births
2019 animal deaths